Raw FM is an Australian narrowcast radio network, consisting of stations in New South Wales, Australian Capital Territory, Victoria and Queensland.

The network was started with the opening of a station on the Central Coast of New South Wales in 1999 and then expanded to take on the Northern Beaches of Sydney, parts of New South Wales, Gold Coast and Australian Capital Territory. It consists of 29 stations linked via the Optus D2 satellite.

Programming
Raw FM's programming is aimed at the 14-30 age group.
The station broadcasts a mix of  electro house, indie dance, Club Hits and Urban sounds and features programs from Roger Sanchez, Above & Beyond, Global Dance Session, as well as live broadcasts from major clubs and events in its broadcast areas.

The service is delivered by Optus D2 satellite through Globecast to each location in its broadcast network.

FM radio frequencies and locations

New South Wales
87.6FM Albury-Wodonga
87.6FM Armidale
87.6FM Brookvale
87.6FM Cabarita
88.0FM Central Coast
88.0FM Coffs Harbour
88.0FM Collaroy
87.6FM Goulburn
87.6FM Grafton
87.6FM Jindabyne
87.6FM Kempsey
87.6FM Kingscliff
87.6FM Lake Cathie
88.0FM Macksville
87.6FM Murwillumbah
88.0FM Newcastle
87.6FM Nowra
87.8FM Ocean Shores
88.0FM Perisher
87.6FM Port Macquarie
87.6FM Pottsville
87.6FM Queanbeyan
87.8FM Sawtell
88.0FM South West Rocks
88.0FM Terranora
88.0FM Ulladulla
88.0FM Urunga
88.0FM Wagga Wagga
87.6FM Wauchope
87.6FM Yamba

Queensland
88.0FM Burleigh Heads
88.0FM Coolangatta
88.0FM Surfers Paradise

Victoria
87.6FM Shepparton

References

External links

Australian radio networks
Dance radio stations
Radio stations in New South Wales
Radio stations in Canberra
Radio stations in Wagga Wagga
Radio stations in Queensland
Radio stations on the Gold Coast, Queensland
Radio stations in Victoria
Radio stations established in 1999
1999 establishments in Australia